Telma is an unincorporated community in Chelan County, Washington, United States. Telma is assigned the ZIP code 98826.

Telma is on the Lake Wenatchee U.S. Geological Survey Map.

References

Unincorporated communities in Chelan County, Washington
Unincorporated communities in Washington (state)